Yonge–Dundas Square, or Dundas Square, is a public square at the southeast corner of the intersection of Yonge Street and Dundas Street East in Downtown Toronto, Ontario, Canada. Designed by Brown and Storey Architects, the square was conceived in 1997 as part of revitalizing the intersection. Since its completion in 2002, the square has hosted many public events, performances and art displays, establishing itself as a prominent landmark in Toronto and one of the city's prime tourist attractions. Central to the Downtown Yonge entertainment and shopping district, the square is owned by the city and is the first public square in Canada to be maintained through a public-private partnership. The intersection is one of the busiest in Canada, with over 100,000 people crossing the city's first pedestrian scramble daily.

Surrounding the square are other major landmarks, including the Toronto Eaton Centre, Ed Mirvish Theatre, and the Citytv building. The square is accessible by the Toronto subway at Dundas station and is connected to the PATH. The square is continuously illuminated by large billboard screens and corporate logos, which has led to comparison of the square with Times Square in New York City and Piccadilly Circus in London.

History

In 1998, as part of its Yonge Street Regeneration Project, Toronto City Council approved the expropriation and demolition of the buildings on the site and the construction of Yonge–Dundas Square. The square is a joint project of the city, residents, the McGill Granby Association, the Downtown Yonge Business, and Resident Association, and the Downtown Yonge Business Improvement Area, an association of local businesses. This effort was conceived and spearheaded by Arron Barberian of Barberian's Steak House, Robert Sniderman of the Senator Restaurant and  Councillor Kyle Rae. Ron Soskolne was retained in 1995 to head up the planning of the regeneration project, and went on to become the chair of the Board of Management for the first decade of the square's operation. Designed by Brown + Storey Architects, the square was intended as a new public space in Toronto, somewhat akin to Nathan Phillips Square, designed by Viljo Revell for New City Hall.

In 1999, the square's design received the Award of Excellence for significant building in the design stage by the Canadian Architect magazine, in recognition of it being an outstanding example of contemporary architecture. The next year, Architecture magazine commended the square as a new form of urban space with great presence ... pushes the limits of invention and originality.

Unlike Nathan Phillips Square, however, Yonge–Dundas Square is operated by a separate Board of Management. The site is owned by the City and administered by a Board of Management. The board of management for Yonge–Dundas Square was established in 2001, and is the first public–private partnership in Canada to operate a public square. In 2006, the square's Wi-Fi hotspot, set up by Wireless Toronto, was voted the best in the city.

Some claim that the intersection is the busiest in Canada, with over 56 million people passing through annually. The square's development is cited as modeling New York's Times Square, Tokyo's Shibuya district, and London's Piccadilly Circus. To manage the volume of pedestrians, a pedestrian scramble was installed in August 2008.

The square frequently serves as a venue for public events connected to the city's cultural festivals, including NXNE, the Toronto International Film Festival, Luminato, Nuit blanche and Pride Week. On June 29, 2014, the square hosted the official closing ceremonies of WorldPride.

The square is property of the City of Toronto and is regulated by Toronto Municipal Code Chapter 636: Public Squares. These regulations govern activities in the square and the use of the property. As of April 2014, smoking is prohibited on the entire property of the square.

Following controversy over the namesake of Dundas Street, Henry Dundas, 1st Viscount Melville in delaying the abolition of the transatlantic slave trade, Toronto City Council voted in 2021 to rename Dundas Street and other civic assets named after Dundas - such as Yonge–Dundas Square. A new name will be chosen in April 2022.

Design
The site is bordered on the north by Dundas Street, on the east by Victoria Street, and on the west by Yonge Street. A former street named Dundas Square (previously Wilton Street) forms the southern boundary. Dundas Street, an east–west street through Downtown Toronto, was constructed by connecting pre-existing streets. From the west, Agnes Street intersected at Yonge Street at the present Dundas Street intersection but did not continue east. From the east, Wilton Street connected to Yonge Street approximately 100 metres to the south. In the 20th century, Dundas Street was extended east from the Agnes Street intersection to meet with Wilton Street at Victoria Street, by building a curved road east, then southeast, to intersect with Wilton. Wilton was renamed Dundas Street East, and the section of Wilton west of Victoria Street was renamed Dundas Square. Yonge Street retail stores south of the new Dundas intersection and not in the way of the roadway remained.

The square is on a slight incline, which architects Brown and Storey have said was intended to evoke a theatrical stage. It is made with modular raised square textured  granite slabs (each slab costing approximately $1,500: $1,000 materials plus $500 labour), features a diagonally running zinc canopy along the northern hypotenuse of the "square", a movable plinth which serves as a stage for concerts and other performances, a row of lighted fountains set directly into the pavement, a row of small trees along the southern edge, a transparent canopy over the plinth, and a new entrance to Dundas subway station below. A series of low, circular stone planters was added to the western side of the square in the summer of 2005.

Because Dundas Street bends at the square, it is not actually a square, but an irregular pentagon. This angled northeastern side of the square is known as the hypotenuse, which features a structure supported by 11 concrete pillars of the type used to make overpasses on highways. This creates an industrial urban aesthetic, which, being to the north, casts no shadows on the rest of the space. The other three sides are square (i.e., at right angles to one another and to Yonge and Dundas Streets). As well, there is a road which traverses the square known as Dundas Square. This is a small street leading from Yonge Street to Dundas Street.

Features
The surface of Yonge–Dundas Square is not level; it is sloped upward away from Yonge Street to allow enough height to provide clearance for the Toronto Parking Authority garage entrance. The architects planned the slope of the surface to make it interesting and to accommodate the necessary clearances for what lies underneath. Level P1 houses the washrooms and changerooms, a green room for stage performers, and various utilities rooms, custodial and supply closets, and the water treatment plant and pump rooms for the fountains.

At the southeast and southwest corners of Yonge–Dundas Square are drinking water fountains. The water fountain on the southwest corner (nearest to Yonge Street) is known for its large, cool stream of water that flows down the fountain to drains in the ground. The stream produced by the other fountain is warmer and flows less copiously. On the other hand, the fountain nearest Yonge street is also near a protrusion in the ground that has become a popular seat.

Fountains
The centrepiece of the square is the array of fountains designed by Dan Euser of Waterarchitecture. Two rows of ten fountains are spread out across the square's main walkway so that visitors have the opportunity to walk through or around the fountains. Unlike many other city fountains, the Dundas Square fountains were meant for waterplay and include a sophisticated filtration system that (according to both of the architects) keeps the water at or above "pool quality" water. According to Euser, the water is treated to maintain health standards for waterplay. According to facility administrator Christine MacLean, the granite that was chosen for the entire space has non-slip properties for the safety of those running through or playing in the fountains. Each of the 10 water fountains consists of a stainless steel grille with 30 ground nozzles (arranged in three rows of 10) under it.

The entire rock surface is of a very dark (almost black) colour and effectively absorbs sunlight, thus creating a warm surface on which to rest. The water runs under the dark rock slabs and is thus heated by them, so that the fountain water is solar heated. Three curved lighting masts along the south edge of the square, made of hollow structural steel, have a high-gloss white finish that contrasts with the rough non-slip texture of the black granite, and each support six mercury vapour arc lamps that create evening light that comes from approximately the same directions as natural sunlight does during the day (i.e., from various southerly directions).

The fountains comprise a dynamic art installation and water sculpture in which the 600 water jets are programmed to vary, dynamically, over time. The fountains usually operate 24 hours a day. Other than the aquatic play area in front of the Ontario Science Centre (the centrepiece of Teluscape), Dundas Square is Toronto's only 24-hour waterplay area, open all day and night except during special events, maintenance, and other exceptions. The fountains usually run from around mid-April to the end of October, making this one of two aquatic play areas in Toronto that opens very early in the season and closes very late in the season.

To reduce costs, only the middle channel (the middle 10 nozzles of each fountain) can be animated, but the outer two channels can still be globally controlled. The outer two channels are often used to set a background (pedestal) level while the middle channel animates, typically for eight-second intervals. The directionality imposed by the middle channel's sequencer encourages bathers to run west rather than east. Moreover, the sequencer makes the bathing experience optimal for joggers who run west at exactly 20 km/h.

Architects Brown and Storey, fountain creator Dan Euser, the firm that initiated the bidding, former Councillor Kyle Rae, and the management of Dundas Square have all confirmed that waterplay was one of the intended uses of the space. The fountains are intended to appeal to children and adults, and there is evidence that has been realized.

Because many people drink from the ground spray nozzles (some people even fill up water bottles from the ground sprays), and since waterplay is one of the intended uses, the water is tested daily, between 9 a.m. and 10 a.m., by the Toronto health department. The water is treated with bromine, which many bathers prefer to chlorine. There are three separate water treatment facilities, one for each group of ten westmost nozzles in each grille (200 nozzles total), another for the middle row of ten in each grille, and a third for all of the eastmost nozzles. The water that runs into the grilles travels west, under the raised floor of the Dundas Square slabs, to the treatment facility under the west end of the waterplay area.

Surrounding buildings

Yonge–Dundas Square is located within Downtown Yonge Business Improvement Area (BIA). Other projects in the area include the redevelopment of the Eaton Centre, the construction of a new retail and cinema complex to the north in 2007, called 10 Dundas East (formerly Toronto Life Square and before that known as Metropolis), and the opening of 33 Dundas Street East to the southeast (on the corner of Victoria and Dundas), which used to be the home of Olympic Spirit Toronto. On October 22, 2007, Rogers Media announced that it would buy this building as a new home for its Citytv and Omni Television stations. This new studio space is now operational.

A "media tower" – a scaffold for billboards, operated by Branded Cities – has been constructed on the northwest corner of Yonge and Dundas. It is advertised as the tallest media tower in the world. Another large media tower, complete with a video screen, is a major feature of the Rogers Media building on the southeast corner of Dundas Square; the video screen usually shows the CITY-TV broadcast. The building that was home to the Hard Rock Cafe (now a Shoppers Drug Mart) on the southwest corner of the square originally features a series of billboards, but these were replaced by a large video screen in 2017. The introduction of the imposing media tower, screens, and brightly illuminated advertising billboards has been too great a sacrifice for some area residents, who feel a loss of the neighbourhood's identity and character (see "Controversy", below).
 
The redevelopment of the Eaton Centre and the building at Victoria and Dundas were completed in 2004. Toronto Life Square, formerly known as the Metropolis development, began in January 1999 after the City of Toronto expropriated a number of properties, and a phased opening began in 2007. It was renamed "10 Dundas East" after Toronto Life magazine's parent company, St. Joseph Communications, sued to have the magazine's name removed from the building. In 2019, an existing smaller screen and two billboards were replaced by a massive curved video display on the corner of the building facing Yonge and Dundas.

Criticism
Criticism ranges from suggestions that the city has missed an opportunity for more green space within the downtown core (or that they have missed an opportunity for what some critics consider more interesting architectural elements) to questions of what the true intent behind the ostensibly public square is. The Toronto Public Space Committee and organizers of Toronto iterations of the Reclaim The Streets phenomenon often point to the square as an example of what they consider a negative trend in urban planning.

The square is surrounded on all sides by gigantic commercial billboards in a redevelopment scheme modeled on New York City's Times Square or London's Piccadilly Circus. Many have pointed to the square as a prime example of the creeping privatization of public space. Those making this point have been bolstered by the fact that the square's board is populated by local businesses and residents. The board of management for the square is an ABC organization of the City of Toronto. While there are permit fees for commercial events, community groups can use the square for free under the square's community use policy. All events are charged back for staffing and equipment use.

See also 

 Albert Campbell Square
 Mel Lastman Square
 Nathan Phillips Square
 Pecaut Square
 List of city squares

 similar venues with electronic billboards, jumbotrons and media towers.
 Shibuya, (Tokyo)
 Times Square, (New York City)

References

External links

 
 Yonge-Dundas Square description at the Brown + Storey Architects website
 Dundas Square Gallery
 Transmedia:29:59 - urban screen art project, Dundas Square

Squares in Toronto
Music venues in Toronto
PATH (Toronto)
Shopping districts and streets in Canada
Festival venues in Canada